Qoʻrgʻontepa District is a district of Andijan Region, Uzbekistan. The capital of the district is the city Qoʻrgʻontepa. The district was established on September 29, 1926.

Administrative divisions
The district consists of two cities (Qoʻrgʻontepa and Qorasuv), one urban-type settlement (Sultonobod) and five village councils (Chimyon, Dardoq, Qoʻrgʻontepa, Savay and Sultonobod).

References

External links
Location and photographs

Districts of Uzbekistan
Andijan Region